Göran Bengtsson (born 19 May 1956) is a former Swedish handball player who competed in the 1984 Summer Olympics.

In 1984 he finished fifth with the Swedish team in the Olympic tournament. He played all six matches and scored six goals.

References

Swedish male handball players
Olympic handball players of Sweden
Handball players at the 1984 Summer Olympics
1956 births
Living people
HK Drott players